Suren Das College, established in 1979, is a general degree college at Hajo in Kamrup district, Assam. This college is affiliated with the Gauhati University. This college offers different bachelor's degree courses in arts, science, and vocational.

References

External links
Official website

Universities and colleges in Assam
Colleges affiliated to Gauhati University
Educational institutions established in 1979
1979 establishments in Assam